Verhoek is a Dutch toponymic surname. It is a contraction of van der Hoek, meaning "from the corner". Notable people with the surname include:

Gijsbert Verhoek (1644–1690), Dutch Golden Age painter, brother of Pieter
Iris Verhoek (born 2001), Dutch singer
John Verhoek (born 1989), Dutch footballer, brother of Wesley
Peter Verhoek (born 1955), New Zealand cricketer
Pieter Verhoek (1633–1702), Dutch Golden Age painter, brother of Gijsbert
Wesley Verhoek (born 1986), Dutch footballer, brother of John

References

Dutch-language surnames